The first maximum speed law for Mexico was created in 1903 by then president Porfirio Díaz.

Current speed limits are:
 in parking lots and residential areas.
 in streets with no speed limit.
 on urban arterial roads (ejes, calzadas, beltways and freeways).
 in avenues with no speed limit.
 on rural two-lane roads.
 on two-lane highways.
 on major highways inside cities.
 on major highways leaving or approaching towns or cities.
 on major highways.

No Mexican highway allows going beyond 110 km/h, but the speed limit is enforced generally above  only.

References

Mexico
Transportation in Mexico